Augustines is the second studio album by the American indie rock band Augustines, released on February 3, 2014. The album received generally favourable reviews. "Walkabout" was featured in the trailer for the movie The Judge.

Track listing

Personnel 
 William McCarthy - vocals, guitar
 Eric Sanderson - bass, engineer, mixing
 Rob Allen - drums
 Augustines - producers, string arrangements, horn arrangements 
 Peter Katis - engineer, instrumentation, mixing, producer
 John Panos - flugelhorn, Trumpet
 Kit Karlson - engineer, piano, tuba
 Al Hardamon - horn Arrangements, trombone
 Rob Moose - string Arrangements, viola, violin
 Jason Hammel - vocals
 Kori Gardner - vocals
 Mates of State - vocals
 Andrew Joslyn - violin
 Mike Brown - hammond B3
 Greg Calbi - mastering
 Greg Giorgio - engineer, mixing
 David Groener - engineer
 Chris Montgomery - engineer
 Scott Reed - engineer
 Marlowe Stern - engineer
 Chris Becker - cover photo
 Glen "Ninja" Alberastine - artwork, design
 Luke Gabrieli - artwork

References

2014 albums
Augustines (band) albums